The 2016 San Diego Aviators season was the 22nd season of the franchise in World TeamTennis (WTT) and its third playing in San Diego County, California.

Led by 2016 WTT Male Most Valuable Player Ryan Harrison and Coach of the Year John Lloyd, the Aviators had 8 wins and 4 losses, the best regular-season record in WTT. They went on to defeat the Orange County Breakers, 25–14 in extended play, in the WTT Finals to win the King Trophy as WTT champions. Raven Klaasen was named WTT Finals Most Valuable Player. The league title was the third in franchise history and the first since moving to San Diego.

Season recap

Front-office changes
Jim Ault was named the new general manager and assistant head coach of the Aviators with Tamara Sarafijanovic as assistant general manager.

Prior to the start of the 2016 season, Billy Berger's name no longer appeared on the team's website as CEO or minority owner.

New logo
On February 29, 2016, the Aviators started using a new logo on their website and Facebook page. The new logo retains the use of red and white that was featured in the 2015 logo.

Draft
James Blake, who played for the team as a wildcard in 2015, was assigned by WTT to Aviators as a designated player. He was selected with the Aviators' first pick in the marquee player portion of the draft. The Aviators did not protect 2015 marquee player Madison Keys, and they did not make a selection in the second round of the marquee player portion of the draft. In the roster portion of the draft, the Aviators protected Raven Klaasen and Darija Jurak. They chose Shelby Rogers with their first-round selection, leaving 2015 amateur and winner of the 2015 US Open boys' singles title, but now turned professional, Taylor Fritz unprotected. The protection of Jurak and the selection of Rogers also meant that the Aviators could not protect Květa Peschke, the last remaining member of the team who played for the franchise when it was known as the New York Sportimes, and Chanelle Scheepers. The Aviators chose Daniel Evans with their third-round selection in the roster player portion of the draft. They elected not to select a roster-exempt player in the fifth round.

Harrison replaces Evans
On July 8, 2016, Daniel Evans withdrew from WTT. On July 15, 2016, the Aviators announced the signing of Ryan Harrison as a roster player to fill the spot created by Evans's departure.

A rivalry is born
The Aviators opened their season with a four-game series against the Orange County Breakers, who were returning to Southern California after playing the previous two seasons as the Austin Aces. When the Breakers last called Orange County their home in 2013, the Aviators had not yet moved to California and were known as the New York Sportimes. While the teams did not have any history as geographic rivals, the franchises did meet in the 2005 WTT Finals with the Sportimes earning the title with a 21–18 victory over the Newport Beach Breakers. The two franchises also boasted the best regular-season records in WTT over the past two seasons with the Aviators achieving the feat in 2014, and the Aces doing so in 2015.

The Aviators hosted the opening match on July 31, 2016. After dropping the first two sets, including a loss by James Blake in the opening set of men's singles, the Aviators regrouped and won the next two sets of men's and women's doubles to tie the match at 15 all. It was Blake and Raven Klaasen in the men's doubles set and Darija Jurak and Shelby Rogers in women's doubles. The teams exchanged breaks in the final set of mixed doubles, before Jurak and Klaasen won the set tiebreaker, 5–2, to give the Aviators a 20–19 victory.

The following evening, the Breakers hosted the Aviators in their first home match in Orange County since 2013. For the second straight match, the Breakers won the first two sets to take an early lead, and the Aviators responded with set wins in men's and women's doubles. Klaasen and Ryan Harrison won the men's doubles, and Jurak and Rogers won the women's doubles. The Aviators faced a 17–16 deficit heading into the final set of men's singles. After the players each held serve in three of their four service games, Steve Johnson secured a 22–20 victory for the Breakers by winning a tiebreaker over Harrison.

The teams returned to Carlsbad for the third match of their series on August 2, 2016. This time, the Aviators dominated play in the early part of the match. Harrison won the men's singles set, 5–2. Rogers followed with a 5–1 set win in women's singles. Harrison teamed with Klaasen for a 5–2 set win in men's doubles, and the Aviators had a 15–5 lead after three sets. After the Breakers won the fourth set of women's doubles to cut the lead to 18–10, they sent the match to extended play by winning a fifth-set tiebreaker in mixed doubles. However, the Aviators broke Alla Kudryavtseva's serve in the first game of extended play to secure a 23–15 victory.

The following evening in Orange County, the Breakers won the opening set of men's doubles, and the Aviators responded by winning the next three sets, two of them in tiebreakers, to take a 17–16 lead to the final set. Rogers and Harrison won the women's and men's singles, and Klaasen and Jurak followed with a set win in mixed doubles. However, Jurak and Rogers fell behind a break early in the fifth set of women's doubles and were unable to break back. The 5–2 set win gave the Breakers a 21–19 victory. The four matches in four nights ended in a split and had quickly developed the feel of a rivalry. "It definitely starts to get a little personal," said the Breakers' Nicole Gibbs. "Things got a little feisty tonight, so it was a good night to bring the cameras. We were getting in each other's faces, and there were some big 'Come ons'. Definitely some emotional moments."

Winning streak
Following the series with the Breakers, the Aviators opened a four-match homestand by hosting the expansion New York Empire on August 5, 2016. Ryan Harrison won the opening set of men's singles in a tiebreaker and teamed with Raven Klaasen for a 5–2 set win in the third set of men's doubles. Shelby Rogers won the second set of women's singles in a tiebreaker. Klaasen teamed with Darija Jurak to take the final set of mixed doubles, 5–3, and seal a 24–18 victory.

The following day, the Aviators signed Ernests Gulbis as a substitute player.

Gulbis opened the Aviators' match that evening against the five-time defending WTT champion Washington Kastles by taking the men's singles set, 5–2. He later paired with Klaasen for a 5–2 set win in the third set of men's doubles. Jurak teamed with Rogers to take the fourth set of women's doubles and with Klaasen to take the fifth set of mixed doubles, both by 5–3 scores, to give the Aviators a 21–15 win.

The Aviators got off to a quick start the following evening as Harrison won the opening set of men's singles, Rogers won the second set of women's singles, and Harrison and Klaasen took the third set of men's doubles to build a 15–8 lead against the Springfield Lasers. The Lasers battled back, winning the fourth set of women's doubles in a tiebreaker and the fifth set of mixed doubles, 5–2, to send the match to extended play with the Aviators leading, 21–18. After the Lasers held serve in the first game of extended play, Klaasen held serve to clinch a 22–19 Aviators victory.

On August 8, 2016, the Aviators hosted the Philadelphia Freedoms in their final home match of the season. Harrison won the opening set of men's singles and teamed with Klaasen to take the third set of men's doubles. Rogers posted a 5–0 set win in the second set of women's singles. After the Freedoms won the fourth and fifth sets, Klaasen, playing mixed doubles with Jurak, held serve in the opening game of extended play to secure a 23–15 win and a perfect home record of 6 wins and 0 losses.

The Aviators opened their season-ending four-match road trip against the Kastles. Rogers won the second set of women's singles, 5–3, over Madison Brengle and then teamed with Jurak to win a tiebreaker in the fourth set of women's doubles that gave the Aviators an 18–17 lead. Harrison won the final set of men's singles, 5–3, to seal a 23–20 victory, the fifth straight for the Aviators, and improve the team's record to 7 wins and 2 losses.

WTT Finals berth
After a loss to the Springfield Lasers, the Aviators headed to Forest Hills Stadium for their first match in New York City since July 23, 2013, when they were the home team playing as the New York Sportimes. Players appearing in that 23–15 overtime loss to the Washington Kastles for the Sportimes were Anna-Lena Grönefeld, Robert Kendrick, Květa Peschke and Jesse Witten. But on August 12, 2016, the Aviators would be the road team facing the New York Empire. The Aviators won four of the five sets led by Ryan Harrison who won the opening set of men's singles and teamed with Raven Klaasen to close out the match in the final set of men's doubles. Darija Jurak paired with Klaasen to win the third set of mixed doubles and with Shelby Rogers to win the fourth set of women's doubles. The 24–16 victory gave the Aviators 8 wins and 3 losses and clinched their berth in the WTT Finals. It was the first Finals appearance for the franchise since 2010, when they lost playing as the New York Sportimes and the first postseason appearance for the Aviators since 2014.

On August 13, 2016, the Aviators signed Nick Monroe as a substitute player to fill in for Harrison in the final match of the regular season.

During their final regular-season match against the Philadelphia Freedoms, the Aviators clinched the best overall record in WTT, when the Washington Kastles defeated the Orange County Breakers, 25–19 in extended play. The Aviators later lost their match against the Freedoms to fall to 8 wins and 4 losses, an identical record to that of the Breakers. Since the teams split their four matches during the regular season, the tie in the standings was broken by most games won in head-to-head matches, which favored the Aviators, 82–77. Being the top seed in the WTT Finals resulted in the Aviators being treated as the home team and having the option to set the order of play.

Harrison named MVP and Lloyd Coach of the Year
Ryan Harrison was named 2016 WTT Male Most Valuable Player. Harrison led the league in winning percentage in men's singles and was also second in men's doubles behind teammate Raven Klaasen. John Lloyd was named 2016 WTT Coach of the Year.

WTT Finals
The Aviators met their new rivals, the Orange County Breakers, in the WTT Finals on August 26, 2016, at Forest Hills Stadium in New York City. The Aviators won the first four sets, all by 5–2 scores. Darija Jurak and Raven Klaasen opened with a set win in mixed doubles. Shelby Rogers followed by beating 2016 WTT Female Most Valuable Player Nicole Gibbs in women's singles. Klaasen teamed with Ryan Harrison in men's doubles. Jurak and Rogers took the fourth set of women's doubles to give the Aviators a 20–8 lead. Dennis Novikov won a tiebreaker against Harrison in the final set of men's singles to send the match to extended play with the Aviators leading 24–13. Novikov held serve in the opening game of extended play. However, Harrison, who won a US Open qualifying match earlier in the day to secure a spot in the Grand Slam tournament, held serve in the second game, giving the Aviators a 25–14 victory and the 2016 King Trophy. It was the third WTT championship in franchise history and the first since moving to San Diego. The previous titles came in 2005, playing as the New York Sportimes and in 2008, playing as the New York Buzz. It was the first time in franchise history that the Aviators finished with WTT's best regular-season record and followed up by winning the league championship. Klaasen was named WTT Finals Most Valuable Player. "It feels really nice to get the MVP award, but it feels a bit undeserving, because our whole team played very well," said Klaasen. "We were apart for four days, and when we saw each other again last night, it felt like we had been apart for a year. Our team chemistry has been great. We will be friends for the rest of our lives." Aviators coach John Lloyd said, "It brings a lot of memories back; I played back in the US Open, when it was on grass and clay. In fact, on this court I lost to the great Björn Borg. It was nice to play on this beautiful court. To come back and win this title was great."

Event chronology
 March 25, 2016: The Aviators protected Raven Klaasen and Darija Jurak and selected James Blake, Shelby Rogers and Daniel Evans at the WTT Draft. The Aviators left Taylor Fritz, Květa Peschke and Chanelle Scheepers unprotected.
 July 8, 2016: Daniel Evans withdrew from WTT for undisclosed reasons.
 July 15, 2016: The Aviators signed Ryan Harrison as a roster player.
 August 6, 2016: The Aviators signed Ernests Gulbis as a substitute player.
 August 12, 2016: With a record of 8 wins and 3 losses, the Aviators clinched a berth in the WTT Finals with a 24–16 road victory against the New York Empire.
 August 13, 2016: The Aviators signed Nick Monroe as a substitute player.
 August 13, 2016: With a record of 8 wins and 3 losses, the Aviators clinched the best regular-season record in WTT, when the Washington Kastles defeated the Orange County Breakers, 25–19, in extended play.
 August 26, 2016: The Aviators won the King Trophy as WTT champions, when they defeated the Orange County Breakers, 25–14 in extended play, in the WTT Finals. It is the third WTT championship for the franchise and the first since moving to San Diego.

Draft picks
Since the Aviators had the second-worst record among WTT's nonplayoff teams in 2015, they selected second in each round of the draft. The league conducted its 2016 draft on March 25, in Key Biscayne, Florida. James Blake, who played for the team as a wildcard in 2015, was assigned by WTT to the Aviators as a designated player. The selections made by the Aviators are shown in the table below.

Match log

Regular season
{| align="center" border="1" cellpadding="2" cellspacing="1" style="border:1px solid #aaa"
|-
! colspan="2" style="background:#CD231F; color:white" | Legend
|-
! bgcolor="ccffcc" | Aviators Win
! bgcolor="ffbbbb" | Aviators Loss
|-
! colspan="2" | Home team in CAPS
|}

WTT Finals
{| align="center" border="1" cellpadding="2" cellspacing="1" style="border:1px solid #aaa"
|-
! colspan="2" style="background:#CD231F; color:white" | Legend
|-
! bgcolor="ccffcc" | Aviators Win
! bgcolor="ffbbbb" | Aviators Loss
|-
! colspan="2" | Home team in CAPS
|}

Team personnel
References:

Players and coaches

 John Lloyd, Coach
 James Blake
 Ernests Gulbis
 Ryan Harrison
 Darija Jurak
 Raven Klaasen
 Nick Monroe
 Shelby Rogers

Front office
 Fred Luddy, Principal Owner
 Jack McGrory, Minority Owner
 Jim Ault, General Manager

Notes:

Statistics
Players are listed in order of their game-winning percentage provided they played in at least 40% of the Aviators' games in that event, which is the WTT minimum for qualification for league leaders in individual statistical categories.
Men's singles - regular season

Women's singles - regular season

Men's doubles - regular season

Women's doubles - regular season

Mixed doubles - regular season

Team totals - regular season

Men's singles - WTT Finals

Women's singles - WTT Finals

Men's doubles - WTT Finals

Women's doubles - WTT Finals

Mixed doubles - WTT Finals

Team totals - WTT Finals

Men's singles - all matches

Women's singles - all matches

Men's doubles - all matches

Women's doubles - all matches

Mixed doubles - all matches

Team totals - all matches

Transactions
 March 25, 2016: The Aviators protected Raven Klaasen and Darija Jurak and selected James Blake, Shelby Rogers and Daniel Evans at the WTT Draft. The Aviators left Taylor Fritz, Květa Peschke and Chanelle Scheepers unprotected.
 July 8, 2016: Daniel Evans withdrew from WTT for undisclosed reasons.
 July 15, 2016: The Aviators signed Ryan Harrison as a roster player.
 August 6, 2016: The Aviators signed Ernests Gulbis as a substitute player.
 August 13, 2016: The Aviators signed Nick Monroe as a substitute player.

Individual honors and achievements
The following table shows individual honors bestowed upon players and coaches of the San Diego Aviators in 2016.

Ryan Harrison led the league in winning percentage in men's singles and was second behind teammate Raven Klaasen in men's doubles.

Shelby Rogers was third in WTT in winning percentage in women's singles.

Klaasen and Darija Jurak were tied for sixth in WTT in winning percentage in mixed doubles.

See also

 Sports in San Diego

References

External links
San Diego Aviators official website
World TeamTennis official website

San Diego Aviators season
San Diego Aviators 2016
San Diego Aviators 2016
San Diego Aviators